Anime Web Turnpike (also known as Anipike) was a web directory founded in August 1995 by Jay Fubler Harvey. It served as a large database of links to various anime and manga websites. With well over 40,000 links, it had one of the largest organized collection of anime and manga related links. Users could add their own website to the database by setting up a username on the site and adding it to the applicable category. The website also had services such as a community forum, chat room and a magazine. The Anime Broadcasting Network, Inc. acquired the Anime Web Turnpike in 2000 with plans to enhance and expand the site, but multiple technical issues delayed these plans.  As of Nov 2014, the site has gone offline. The site was back online as of July 2016, with no new posts since 2014. As of March 2021, the website has not been updated.

Reception
In 1995, the site was mentioned among 101 Internet sites to visit. The site and its creator were featured in the 2003 documentary film Otaku Unite! In 2003, Anime Web Turnpike was ranked the number three "must visit" anime website by the online magazine Animefringe.

References

External links
Official Website
Anime Web Turnpike

Anime and manga websites
Internet properties established in 1995
Web directories